Jean-Jacques Manget (or Johann Jacob Mangetus) (1652–1742) was a Genevan physician and writer. He was known for his work on epidemic diseases such as bubonic plague and tuberculosis.  In addition to his own researches, he assiduously compiled preceding medical literature.  With Théophile Bonet, he is considered one of the "great compilers" of knowledge in the areas of medicine, surgery and pharmacology. He also published a major collection of alchemical works, the Bibliotheca Chemica Curiosa (1702).

Life
He was born in Geneva, the son of a merchant. He graduated as a physician at the University of Valence in 1678. Later he became the Dean of the Valence medical faculty. Frederick III, Elector of Brandenburg made Manget his personal physician in 1699.

Works
Manget was one of the first doctors to carry out studies of the pathological anatomy of miliary tuberculosis.  He coined the term based on his observation of widespread tiny lesions like millet seeds in the liver, lungs, spleen, and mesentery.

He published Traité de la Peste (Geneva: Philippe Planche, 1721), a major treatise on the bubonic plague, and was well known as a plague doctor. 
Manget reported that the exotic new drug ipecac had been effectively used in the treatment of plague in Marseille.
He advised the adoption of draconian measures to ensure quarantine and prevent the transmission of plague. Such measures were reported to have been successful in Silesia.

He published a large collection of alchemical works, the Bibliotheca Chemica Curiosa (1702). Many of the 170 works included were already rare.

Bibliography

Bibliotheca anatomica, two volumes (Geneva, 1685)
Bibliotheca curiosa chemica, two volumes (Geneva, 1702)][http://nbn-resolving.de/urn:nbn:de:hbz:061:2-31549 Bibliotheca medico-practica sive rerum medicarum thesaurus cumulatissimus: tomis octo comprehensis (Geneva, 1695)

1, 1. 1739
1, 2. 1739

2, 1. 1739
2, 2. 1739

3, 1. 1739
3, 2. 1739

4, 1. 1739
4, 2. 1739

Traité de la peste recueilli des meilleurs auteurs anciens et modernes (Geneva, 1721)

Notes

1652 births
1742 deaths
Physicians from the Republic of Geneva
18th-century writers from the Republic of Geneva